Tail Wani, commonly known as Tailwani, is a village in Anantnag tehsils in Anantnag district, Jammu and Kashmir, India. Tail Wani village is located in Anantnag Tehsil of Anantnag district in Jammu & Kashmir. It is situated 17 km away from Anantnag.

Demographics
According to the 2011 Census of India, Tail Wani village has a total population of 4,840 people including 2,431 males and 2,409 females; and has a literacy rate of 52.44%.

References 

Villages in Anantnag district